Davidović is a Serbo-Croatian surname, a patronymic derived from the given name David. It may refer to:

Branko Davidović (born 1959), footballer
Dalibor Davidović (born 1972), Croatian musicologist and university professor
Dimitri Davidovic (born 1944), retired Belgian footballer
Dimitrije Davidović (1789-1838), Serbian politician
Goran Davidović (born 1968), Serbian doctor and politician
Ljubomir Davidović (1863–1940), Yugoslav politician
Miodrag Davidović (born 1957), Montenegrin businessman, economist and politician

See also
Davidovich

Croatian surnames
Serbian surnames
Patronymic surnames
Surnames from given names